Donald Sinclair (July 1829 – November 19, 1900) was an Ontario businessman and political figure. He represented Bruce North in the Legislative Assembly of Ontario as a Liberal member from 1867 to 1883.

He was born on the Isle of Islay, Scotland and came to Peel County in Canada West in 1851, later settling in Bruce County. Sinclair taught school for several years in Bruce County and near Toronto. He was elected deputy reeve for Arran township in 1863. He moved to Paisley in 1869 and opened a general store there.

In 1871, Sinclair married Isabella Adair.

In 1883, he was named registrar of deeds for Bruce County.

He died in Toronto, where he had gone to seek medical advice.

References

External links

1829 births
1900 deaths
Immigrants to the Province of Canada
Ontario Liberal Party MPPs
People from Bruce County
People from Islay
Scottish emigrants to pre-Confederation Ontario